This is a list of past and current municipal poets laureate serving towns, counties, and cities in New Mexico.
 Poets laureate serving the Navajo Nation which spans portions of New Mexico, Arizona, and Utah are also listed.

Navajo Nation
Luci Tapahonso - 2013-2015
Laura Tohe - 2015-2019

Santa Fe
Arthur Sze - 2006-2008 
Valerie Martínez 2008-2010

External Links
Poets Laureate at New Mexico State Library

References

New Mexico
Poets from New Mexico
Lists of poets